This page shows the results of the cycling competition at the 1995 Pan American Games, held from March 11 to March 26, 1995 in Mar del Plata, Argentina. There were a total of eight men's and six women's events.

Men's competition

Men's 1,000 m Sprint (Track)

Men's 1,000 m Time Trial (Track)

Men's Points Race (Track)

Men's 4,000 m Individual Pursuit (Track)

Men's 4,000 m Team Pursuit (Track)

Men's Individual Race (Road)

Men's Individual Time Trial (Road)

Men's Mountain Bike (MTB)

Women's competition

Women's 1,000 m Sprint (Track)

Women's 3,000 m Individual Pursuit (Track)

Women's 3,000 m Points Race (Track)

Women's Individual Race (Road)

Women's Individual Time Trial (Road)

Women's Mountain Bike (MTB)

Medal table

References
Results
Results HickokSports.com

P
Events at the 1995 Pan American Games
1995
1995 in road cycling
1995 in track cycling
1995 in mountain biking
International cycle races hosted by Argentina